Francisco Horta Cú (born 26 September 1993) is a Mexican professional boxer who challenged for the WBO junior  featherweight title in 2019.

Early life
Horta was born on 26 September 1993 in Campeche City, Campeche as the second of three brothers. He began boxing at the age of nine under the tutelage of his father, trainer Francisco Horta Collí, and made his amateur debut in the 25 kg division in a boxing exhibition at a fair. Horta later represented his state at the national level, winning a bronze medal at the 2008 .

Professional career
Horta made his professional debut on 18 February 2011, defeating Albert Pachecho by split decision in his hometown of Campeche. He suffered defeats in his second and third fights due to being abruptly moved up to eight-round bouts. He lost a third time to Guillermo Rodríguez in 2014 before going on a 13-fight unbeaten streak, improving his record to 20–3–1.

On 7 December 2019, Horta faced Emanuel Navarrete for his WBO junior featherweight title in the main event of a Top Rank on ESPN+ card in Puebla. He was overwhelmed by the champion, and the referee waved off the fight in the fourth round in Navarrete's favor.

Personal life
Horta moved to Cancún early in his professional career, initially staying in a three-by-three meter room with no bed. He is an avid road cyclist, traversing the Yucatán Peninsula from Cancún to Tenabo over a span of seven days in 2018. Horta moved to Tijuana after the trip. He has also served as a motivational speaker under a government program, talking about his journey at various schools and universities in the state of Campeche.

Professional boxing record

References

External links
 

Living people
1993 births
Mexican male boxers
Super-bantamweight boxers
Boxers from Campeche
Boxers from Quintana Roo
People from Campeche City
People from Cancún